Neßmersiel belongs to the municipality Dornum in the rural district Aurich in Lower Saxony, Germany. Neßmersiel is located about 5 kilometres northwest of Dornum. From 1867 to 1977, Neßmersiel belonged to Norden (Altkreis Norden).

The original port was built about 1570. Grain was shipped to Bremen, Hamburg, the Netherlands and Norway. By 1700, the harbour had to be moved closer to the sea when the original location filled with silt from the dikes. By 1930, the new location was also closed. The ferry to Baltrum was built in 1969/1970.

Most coastal tours of the north German sea coast begin here at Neßmersiel. Each year 10 - 12 million migratory birds visit nearby Wattenmeer National Park of Lower Saxony (Nationalpark Niedersächsisches Wattenmeer).

The resort village of Neßmersiel lies directly behind the dike and contains mostly holiday homes. There are also restaurants, hotels, cafes, and numerous shops. A playground for children is at the beach. 

The "Sturmfrei" is new since March 2007. The complex includes a 3D-cinema, wellness center, restaurant, Show- and Sportcourt and a big kidsarea. The "Sturmfrei" is the biggest Funcenter at the German Northseacoast

Near Nessmersiel a Bavarian sex comedy was filmed in 1973 ("The East Frisian Report"). You can still find some locations from the movie.

Clubs and Institutions
Firebrigade Neßmersiel 
boßelclub So mutt d'r henn Neßmersiel
Heimatverein (home club) Neßmersiel
Fishing club Neßmersiel
AWO Town club Neßmersiel
SPD Town club Neßmersiel 
Singkreis Neßmersiel (Shanty-singers)
Jugendgruppe Club 17 (Youth-club)
Nordsee-Yachtclub Neßmersiel

Interesting Sights
Heimatstube (captains room and shop from years ago) in the "Sturmfrei".

External links
Homepage of the municipality Dornum
Reederei Baltrum Linie GmbH & Co. KG
East Frisian Tea dispatch, shop and café in Neßmersiel, too
Hotel Restaurant Fährhaus

Towns in Lower Saxony
Seaside resorts in Germany
Towns and villages in East Frisia